Vote allocation was a system of tactical voting used by Taiwan in the late-1990s, after which the voting system was changed from a single non-transferable vote to a parallel voting system.

Election format
In this system, voters were asked to vote for a party candidate based on items such as their day of birthday so as to evenly distribute votes. In districts where a party was running two candidates, males were sometimes asked to vote for one candidate and females for another to ensure even distribution.

This system was also practiced in Japan and South Korea, where the SNTV system was used.

Hong Kong political parties started to adopt this strategy after 2000 to overcome the effect of the largest remainder system with Hare quota combined with small constituencies (5- to 8-member in 2008).

References

Elections
Politics of Taiwan
Elections in Hong Kong